John Magruder may refer to:

John Magruder (Brigadier General) (1887–1958), Brigadier general in the United States Army
John B. Magruder (1807–1871), military, in United States Army, Confederacy and Imperial Mexican Army
John H. Magruder III, United States Marine Corps officer

See also
Magruder (disambiguation)